With Increase was an American Christian hardcore band, where they primarily played hardcore punk and melodic hardcore. They come from Tampa, Florida. The band started making music in 2008 and disbanded in 2015. The band released a studio album, Death Is Inevitable, in 2014, with Blood and Ink Records.

Background
With Increase was a Christian hardcore band from Tampa, Florida. Their members were Will, Doug, Justin, Paul and Travis.

Music history
The band commenced as a musical entity in 2008. They released the EP, "This Is Not Your Home" in 2010. After a change of vocalists, they released, "Signs of The Time" through Blood and Ink Records.  Their final record, and first full length LP was, Death Is Inevitable, a studio album, that was released on February 25, 2014, from Blood and Ink Records.

Members
Last known line-up
 Will
 Doug
 Justin
 Travis
 Paul

Discography
Studio albums
 Death Is Inevitable (February 25, 2014, Blood and Ink)

References

External links
 Blood and Ink Records

Musical groups from Tampa, Florida
2008 establishments in Florida
2015 disestablishments in Florida
Musical groups established in 2008
Musical groups disestablished in 2015
Blood and Ink Records artists